Nicolas Bergasse (born 24 January 1750 in Lyon – died 28 May 1832 in Paris) was a French lawyer, philosopher, and politician, whose activity was mainly carried out during the beginning of the French Revolution during its early Monarchiens phase.

Life 

After studying philosophy and law, Bergasse became a lawyer at the Parlement of Paris. He was very interested in the Enlightenment and in particular meeting Sieyès and Jean-Jacques Rousseau. In 1781, he became a disciple of Franz Mesmer, and published in 1784 a systemization of Mesmerism titled Considérations sur le magnetisme animal. In the Kornmann case, his quarrel with Beaumarchais made him a famous personality.

In 1789, he was elected Deputy of the Estates-General and become an important face of the Monarchiens Party. During the French Revolution, he created a particular political and constitutional thought inspired by the British and American models and develops a theory of the sovereignty of universal reason. He delivered an important report to the National Assembly on the organization of justice. He survived the Reign of Terror, but stopped active policy.

During the Bourbon Restoration, he published Essay on the law and Essay on the Property, as a result of which he ran into problems with the authorities. He died in Paris in 1832, aged 82.

Works 

Publications about the Animal Magnetism of Franz Mesmer:

 Considérations sur le Magnétisme animal - 1784
 Théorie du Monde suivant les principes de Mesmer

Publications about the Kornmann case (1786-1789):

 Mémoire  sur une question d'adultère, de séduction et de diffamation, pour le sieur Kornmann contre la dame Kornmann, son épouse, le sieur Daudet de Jossan, le sieur Pierre-Augustin Caron de Beaumarchais et M. Le Noir, Conseiller d’État, ancien lieutenant de Police suivi de Pièces Justificatives – 1787
 Observations de M. Kornmann sur un écrit de M. de Beaumarchais – 1787
 Note de M. Kornmann relative à son procès contre Beaumarchais – 1787
 Observations du sieur Kornmann en réponse au mémoire de M. Lenoir – 1787 
 Nouvelles Observations pour le sieur Kornmann contre M. Lenoir – 1787
 Observations du Sieur Kornmann sur une lettre du Sieur Daudet, à l'imprimeur Muller – 1787
 Mémoire du sieur Kornmann en réponse au mémoire du sieur de Beaumarchais – 1787
 Observation du Sieur Kornmann sur un Ecrit signé Séguin et Dubois (suivi de Réponses des Propriétaires Associés dans l’acquisition des Quinze-Vingts aux Réflexions du Sieur Kornmann) – 1787
 Discours sur l’humanité des juges dans l’administration de la justice criminelle – 1787.
 Réflexions préliminaires dans la cause du sieur Bergasse avec le prince de Nassau – 1788 
 Observations du sieur Bergasse, sur l'écrit du sieur de Beaumarchais, ayant pour titre : « Court mémoire, en attendant l'autre », dans la cause du sieur Kornmann – 1788
 Précis pour le sieur Kornmann contre le sieur Le Page, docteur en médecine – 1788
 Considérations sur la liberté du commerce. Ouvrage où l'on examine s'il est avantageux ou nuisible au Commerce que le transport des denrées et des Marchandises soit réduit en un privilège exclusif, Londres, 1788.  
 Observations du sieur Bergasse, dans la cause du sieur Kornmann – 1789
 Plaidoyer prononcé à la Tournelle-criminelle, le jeudi 19 mars 1789, par le sieur Bergasse, dans la cause du sieur Kornmann– 1789

Publications during the French Revolution and the Bourbon Restoration:

 many Discours and Rapports pronounced in the National Assembly ;
 Protestation contre les Assignats-Monnoie (1790)
 Essai sur la loi, la souveraineté et la liberté de la presse (1817)
 Essai sur la propriété (1821)

Bibliography 
 Thérence Carvalho, « Nicolas Bergasse et la souveraineté de la raison universelle », Journal of Interdisciplinary History of Ideas, 2013, vol. 2, n° 1, pp. 1–23 (http://www.ojs.unito.it/index.php/jihi/issue/current/showToc).
 Robert Darnton, Mesmerism and the End of the Enlightenment in France, Cambridge, Harvard University Press, 1995.
 Jean-Denis Bergasse, D’un rêve de réformation à une considération européenne : MM. les députés Bergasse (XVIIIe – XIXe siècles), édité par l’auteur, 1990.
 Louis Bergasse, Un philosophe lyonnais : Nicolas Bergasse, Essai de philosophie chrétienne sous le premier empire, Librairie philosophique J. Vrin, Paris, 1938.
 Louis Bergasse, Un défenseur des principes traditionnels sous la révolution : Nicolas Bergasse, avocat au parlement de paris, député du tiers état de la sénéchaussée Lyon 1750-1832, Librairie Académique Perrin, Paris, 1910.
 René Martineau, Un  avocat du temps jadis, Nicolas Bergasse, Ducourtieux et Gout, Limoges, 1907.
 Léopold de Gaillard, Autres temps : Nicolas Bergasse, député de Lyon à l’Assemblée constituante ; deux enclaves de l’ancienne France : Orange et Avignon, Librairie Plon, Paris, 1893.

1750 births
1832 deaths
Politicians from Lyon
Monarchiens
Members of the National Constituent Assembly (France)
Lawyers from Lyon